The Russo-Crimean Wars were fought between the forces of the Tsardom of Russia and the Crimean Khanate during the 16th century over the region around the Volga River.

In the 16th century, the Wild Steppes in Russia were exposed to the Khanate. During the wars, the Crimean Khanate (supported by the Turkish army) invaded central Russia, devastated Ryazan, and burned Moscow. However, the next year they were defeated in the Battle of Molodi. Despite the defeat, the raids continued. As a result, the Crimean Khanate was invaded several times, and conquered in the late 18th century. The Tatars eventually lost their influence in the regions.

The raids began shortly after the establishment of the Russian buffer state, Qasim Khanate, and the domination of Russia in the Russo-Kazan Wars of the late 15th century.

History

The Crimean invasions of Russia began in 1507, after the death of Moscow's grand duke Ivan III, with the Crimean Khanate attacking the Russian towns of Belev and Kozelsk.

Over the course of the 16th century, the outer border of the Wild Steppes was near the city of Ryazan, outside the Oka River. The main path for the invading forces to Moscow was the Muravsky Trail, running from the Crimean Isthmus of Perekop, between the basins of the Dnieper and Seversky Donets rivers, and finally up to Tula. The Tatars would turn back only after extensive looting and kidnapping, the Tartars usually managed to penetrate 100–200 kilometers into Russian territory. Captives were subsequently sent to the Crimean city of Caffa to be sold into slavery. As a result, the Russian population in the border regions suffered heavily.

Each spring, Russia mobilized up to several thousand soldiers for border service. The defensive lines consisted of a circuit of fortresses and cities.

To protect from invasions by the Nogai Horde in the region between the Volga and Ural 
rivers, the Volga cities of Samara (1586), Tsaritsyn (1589), and Saratov (1590) were founded.

The most damaging invasions occurred in 1517, 1521 (supported by the Khanate of Kazan), 1537 (supported by the Khanate of Kazan, the Lithuanians, and the Ottoman Empire), 1552, 1555, 1570–72 (supported by Sweden and the Ottoman Empire), 1589, 1593, 1640, 1666–67 (supported by Poland–Lithuania), 1671, and 1688.

1570
In 1570 the Crimean Tatars' horde devastated the Ryazan borderland of Russia.

Russo–Crimean War (1570–1572) 

In May 1571, the 120,000-strong Crimean and Turkish army (80,000 Tatars, 33,000 irregular Turks, and 7,000 janissaries) led by the khan of Crimea Devlet I Giray, and Big and Small Nogai hordes and troops of Circassians, bypassed the Serpukhov defensive fortifications on the Oka River, crossed the Ugra River, and rounded the flank of the 6,000-man Russian army. The sentry troops of Russians were crushed by the Crimeans. Not having forces to stop the invasion, the Russian army retreated to Moscow. The rural Russian population also fled to the capital.

The Crimean army devastated unprotected towns and villages around Moscow, and then set fire to suburbs of the capital. Due to a strong wind, the fire quickly expanded. The townspeople, chased by a fire and refugees, rushed to the northern gate of the capital. At the gate and in the narrow streets, there was a crush, people "went in three lines went on heads one of another, and top pressed those who were under them". The army, having mixed up with refugees, lost order, and general prince Belsky died in a fire.

Within three hours, Moscow burnt completely. In one more day, the Crimean army, sated with its pillage, left on the Ryazan road to the steppes. Contemporaries counted up to 80,000 victims of the invasion in 1571, with 150,000 Russian taken as captives. Papal ambassador Possevin testified of the devastation: he counted in 1580 no more than 30,000 inhabitants of Moscow, although in 1520 the Moscow population was about 100,000.

After the burning of Moscow, Devlet Giray Khan, supported by the Ottoman Empire, invaded Russia again in 1572. A combined force of Tatars and Turks, however, this time they were repelled in the Battle of Molodi. In July–August, the 120,000-strong horde of Devlet I Giray of Crimea was also defeated by the Russian army, led by Prince Mikhail Vorotynsky and Prince Dmitriy Khvorostinin.

After 1572 

Later, the Russian expansion turned to the Black Sea region and the Crimean khanate was invaded several times in the 18th century and finally conquered during the Russo-Turkish Wars.

Incomplete list of Tatar raids

This list does not include raids into Poland-Lithuania (75 raids during 1474–1569)

1465: Crimea attacks the Great Horde to prevent it from raiding Russia and disrupting the northern trade
1480: Great Stand on the Ugra River
1507 and 1514: The Raids led by Tatar nobles, avoiding a peace agreement held by the Khan.
1521: Khan and 50,000 men cross the Oka at Kolomna and ravage outskirts of Moscow for 2 weeks
c. 1533: Abatis defense line about 100 km south of the Oka.
1533–1547: (regency for Ivan IV) some 20 large raids on the frontiers.
1541: Crimean Khan crosses the Oka river on rafts under covering fire from Turkish guns.
1555, 1562, 1664, 1565 The Khan lead a large army into Muscovy.
1556–1559: Russians and Zaporozhians raid the Black Sea coast four times.
1564: The city of Ryazan posad was burned.
1571: Russo-Crimean War (1571)
1572: Battle of Molodi
1591: Raid reaches Moscow. 
1591: Artillery stops a raid at Kolomenskoy on the Bank Line. 
1592: Suburbs of Moscow burned.  Russian troops were away fighting Sweden.
1598: Crimeans stopped by Bank Line, withdraw and sue for peace.
1614: Nogai raids within sight of Moscow. During the Time of Troubles so many captives were taken that the price of a slave at Kaffa dropped to fifteen or twenty gold pieces.
1618: Nogais release 15,000 captives in peace treaty with Moscow.
1632: Force from Livny ambushed by Tatars and Janissaries (sic). 300 killed and the rest enslaved.
1632: 20,000 Tatars raid the south, as troops were shifted north for the Smolensk War.
1633: 30,000 Tatars cross Abatis and Bank lines. Thousands were captured from Oka region. This was the last deep raid into Russia. 
1635: Many small war parties invaded Russia south of Ryazan.
1637, 1641–1643: Several raids were led by Nogais and Crimean nobles without permission of Khan.
1643: 600 Tatars and 200 Zaporozhian Cossacks (sic) raid Kozlov. 19 were killed, and 262 were captured.
1644: 20,000 The Tatars raid southern Russia, 10,000 captives.
1645: A raid captures 6,000 captives. It is claimed that the Turks encouraged these raids to obtain galley slaves for a war with Venice.
c. 1650: The Belgorod Line pushes Russian forts 300 km south of the Abatis Line.
c. 1680: Izium Line: Russian forts were built within 150 kilometers of the Black Sea.
1687, 1689: Crimean campaigns: attempt to invade Crimea fails.
1691–92: Several thousand captured near the Izium Line.
1769: A winter raid into New Serbia. Several thousand were captured.
1774: Crimea became a Russian vassal.
1783: Crimea annexed by Russia.

References

Sources

Vasily Klyuchevsky, The Course of Russian History, Vol. 2. 
http://www.kulichki.com/moshkow/HISTORY/ANDREEW_A_R/krym_history.txt
The Full Collection of Russian Annals. The Patriarchal Annals, vol.13, Moscow. 1965

External links
http://www.zum.de/whkmla/military/russia/milxrussianempire.html

Wars involving Russia
History of Crimea
Invasions of Russia
Russo-Turkish wars
1570s in Russia
1570s in the Ottoman Empire